Bradypodion caeruleogula, the Dhlinza dwarf chameleon, Eshowe dwarf chameleon, or uMlalazi dwarf chameleon, is endemic to KwaZulu-Natal, South Africa. It is found in Dhlinza, Entumeni and Ongoye Forests.

References

 Tolley, K. and Burger, M. (2007). Chameleons of Southern Africa. .

External links
 Search for Distribution of Bradypodion caeruleogula

Bradypodion
Endemic reptiles of South Africa
Reptiles described in 2008